Dosanjh may refer to:

 Dosanjh, Moga, a village in Punjab, India
 Dosanjh Kalan, a village in Jalandhar, Punjab, India
 Dosanjh, Khurd (Punjab), a village near Banga, Punjab, India
 Diljit Dosanjh (born 1984), an Indian singer
 Ujjal Dosanjh (born 1947), Canadian politician and former premier of British Columbia